The 1947–48 Serie C was the tenth edition of Serie C, the third highest league in the Italian football league system.

As the previous edition, it was divided into three independent leagues: the Northern, the Central and the Southern League. In order to reduce the number of teams in Serie B and Serie C, there were no promotions and most of the teams were relegated to the newly created Promozione, while the worst teams of every group would be relegated to Prima Divisione. Promozione would be organized by the three interregional leagues again, while the new Serie C will become the third division of the Football League.

Legend

Northern Italy
The Central League was a championship with 144 clubs. All group winners would be promoted to the new Third Series of the Football League, while the last five clubs of each group would be relegated into the regional leagues.

In summer 1948 the FIGC decided that all the runners-up and some historically strongest followers would be admitted into the Football League, while only the last three clubs of each group would be relegated into the regional leagues.

Girone A

Girone B

Girone C

Girone D

Girone E

Girone F

Girone G

Girone H

Girone I

Central Italy
The Central League was a championship with 96 clubs. All group winners and best runners-up would be promoted to the new Third Series of the Football League, while the last five clubs of each group would be relegated into the regional leagues.

In summer 1948 the FIGC decided that all the runners-up and some historically strongest followers would be admitted into the Football League, while best clubs relegated into the regional leagues could pay a re-admittance into the Central League.

Girone A

Girone B

Girone C

Girone D

Girone E

Girone F

Southern Italy
The Southern League was a championship with 48 clubs. All group winners and best runners-up would be promoted to the new Third Series of the Football League, while the last five clubs of each group would be relegated into the regional leagues.

In summer 1948 the FIGC decided that all the runners-up and all third placed clubs and some historically strongest followers would be admitted into the Football League, while all clubs relegated into the regional leagues could pay a re-admittance into the Southern League.

Girone A

Girone B

Girone C

Serie C seasons
3
Italy